The Karnataka State Film Awards 2013, presented by Government of Karnataka, to felicitate the best of Kannada Cinema released in the year 2013.

Lifetime achievement award

Jury 

A committee headed by G. K. Govinda Rao was appointed to evaluate the awards.

Film Awards

Other Awards

References

2013